Kord Khvord or Kard Khowrd or Kord Khurd or Kard Khurd or Kard Khvord may refer to:
 Kord Khvord-e Olya
 Kord Khvord-e Sofla